Flaviflexus huanghaiensis is a Gram-positive and non-motile bacterium from the genus of Flaviflexus which has been isolated from sediments from the coast of Qingdao.

References

Actinomycetales
Bacteria described in 2013